Guibourtia is a flowering plant genus in the family Fabaceae, also known by the common names as Rhodesian copalwood, African Rosewood, Amazique, Bubinga, Kevazingo, and Ovangkol. Scientific Name being Guibourtia spp.

Description
Guibourtia contains 16 species that are native to tropical regions of Africa (13 species) and South America (3 species). They occur in swampy or periodically inundated forests, as well as near rivers or at lakeshores.

The trees grow to 40–50 m tall, with a trunk diameter of 1–2 m, often with a heavily buttressed trunk.

Species
Africa
Guibourtia arnoldiana (De Wild. & T.Durand) J.Léonard – benge, benzi, bubinga, essingang, kevazingo, m'penze, mbenge, mutenye, olive walnut, ovang, waka
Guibourtia carrissoana (M.A.Exell) J.Léonard – African rosewood
Guibourtia coleosperma (Benth.) J.Léonard – African rosewood, false mopane, Rhodesian copal wood
Guibourtia conjugata (Bolle) J.Léonard
Guibourtia copallifera Benn.
Guibourtia demeusei (Harms) J.Léonard – African rosewood, akume, Bubinga, ebana, essingang, kevazingo, kewazingo, okweni, ovang, waka
Guibourtia dinklagei (Harms) J.Léonard
Guibourtia ehie (A.Chev.) J.Léonard – amazakoue, amazoué, anokye, black hyedua, ehie, hyedua, hyeduanini, ovangkol, shedua
Guibourtia leonensis J.Léonard
Guibourtia pellegriniana J.Léonard – akume, bubinga, essingang, kevazingo, kevazingu, ovang, waka
Guibourtia schliebenii (Harms) J.Léonard
Guibourtia sousae J.Léonard
Guibourtia tessmannii (Harms) J.Léonard – akume, bindinga, bubinga, essingang, kevazingo, ovang, waka
South America
Guibourtia chodatiana (Hassl.) J.Léonard (sometimes included in G. hymenaefolia) – Tiete rosewood, Patagonian cherry, sirari
Guibourtia confertiflora (Benth.) J.Léonard
Guibourtia hymenaefolia (Moric.) J.Léonard – Tiete rosewood, Patagonian cherry, sirari

Uses
The genus is used as tropical hardwood timber and is traded under the common names Bubinga, African rosewood, Amazoue, Amazique, Aevazingo, and Avangkol.

The timber is also used for inlays and in the manufacture of high-end furniture (especially by contemporary Arts and Crafts artists), on high-end woodworking tools such as the front knobs and rear handles of smooth planes, knife handles and medium-end tobacco pipes. 

The timber is often used by luthiers for harps and other instruments, such as bass guitars, because of its mellow and well-rounded sound and the various range of grain patterns.  Warwick Bass and Ibanez are known to use bubinga and ovangkol. It has been used in drum shells as well. Drum companies such as Tama offer various high-end drum kits with plies of Bubinga in the shells. Crafter also uses Bubinga on some instruments. Bubinga is also used in both acoustic and electric guitars for its figure and hardness.

Species of Guibourtia also produce Congo copal.

References

 
Trees of Africa
Fabaceae genera